Peter James Dunn  is an Australian historian who specialises in researching all aspects of military operations, training, and exercises that occurred in Australia during the Second World War. Dunn is particularly interested in researching wartime military aircraft losses and, in 2012, was responsible for identifying an unknown aircraft wreck off Magnetic Island as being that of a Curtiss-Wright CW-22 that had ditched in 1943. As part of the Australia Day 2020 Honours List, Dunn was awarded the Medal of the Order of Australia "for service to community history".

Australia @ War
On 22 June 1996, Dunn launched his Australia @ War website where he has described his research as a "part-time hobby". Despite this, the website is particularly renowned for cataloguing the historical details of Second World War military aircraft crashes that occurred across Australia and, as of 2019, the website reportedly listed over 2000 such incidents.

References

External links
Australia @ War

Year of birth missing (living people)
Living people
Recipients of the Medal of the Order of Australia
Australian male non-fiction writers
21st-century Australian historians
Australian military historians
Historians of aviation
20th-century Australian historians
Historians of World War II